This is a list of the members of the European Parliament for France in the 1994 to 1999 session.

List

References
Official 'Members of the European Parliament'

Members of European Parliament in 1994, Politiquemania

1994
List
France